The 2015–16 North American winter was not as frigid across North America and the United States (especially the East Coast) as compared to the 2013–14 and 2014–15 winters. This was mainly due to a strong El Niño, which caused generally warmer-then-average conditions. However, despite the warmth, significant weather systems still occurred, including a snowstorm and flash flooding in Texas at the end of December and a large tornado outbreak at the end of February. Several other smaller snow events affected the Northeast as well, but for the most part the heaviest snowstorms and ice stayed out further west, such as a severe blizzard in western Texas in late December (producing a tornado outbreak as well), and  a major late-season snowstorm in Colorado in mid-April.

While there is no well-agreed-upon date used to indicate the start of winter in the Northern Hemisphere, there are two definitions of winter which may be used. Based on the astronomical definition, winter begins at the winter solstice, which in 2015 occurred late on December 21, and ends at the March equinox, which in 2016 occurred on March 20. Based on the meteorological definition, the first day of winter is December 1 and the last day February 29. Both definitions involve a period of approximately three months, with some variability. Winter is often defined by meteorologists to be the three calendar months with the lowest average temperatures. Since both definitions span the calendar year, it is possible to have a winter storm in two different years.

Seasonal forecasts 

On October 15, 2015, the National Oceanic and Atmospheric Administration's Climate Prediction Center issued its U.S. Winter Outlook. The presence of a strong El Niño event was expected to affect weather and climate patterns by influencing the position of the Pacific jet stream. According to CPC deputy director Mike Halpert at the time of the outlook, "A strong El Niño is in place and should exert a strong influence over our weather this winter" and "While temperature and precipitation impacts associated with El Niño are favored, El Niño is not the only player. Cold-air outbreaks and snow storms will likely occur at times this winter. However, the frequency, number and intensity of these events cannot be predicted on a seasonal timescale." Other oscillations anticipated to have some effect on winter in the United States were the Arctic oscillation and the Madden–Julian oscillation. The precipitation outlook indicated an elevated likelihood of above-average levels precipitation from central and southern California to Texas and Florida and northward to southern parts of New England. Above-average precipitation was also favored in southeastern Alaska, with below-average levels of precipitation favored in central and western Alaska, parts of the Northwestern U.S. and northern Rocky Mountain states, and areas in the vicinity of the Great Lakes and Ohio Valley. 

The temperature outlook favored below-average temperatures in the southern Plains and Southeastern United States. Above-average temperatures were most favored across the West and the northern half of the contiguous United States and Alaska and Hawaii. The drought outlook anticipated improvement in conditions in central and southern California by the end of January 2016, noting the possibility of additional alleviation of drought conditions in February and March. The outlook favored the removal of drought across large parts of the Southwestern U.S., with additional lessening or elimination of drought conditions likely in the southern Plains. Drought conditions were expected to persist across the Pacific Northwest and northern Rocky Mountains, with development likely in Hawaii and areas in the vicinity of the northern Great Lakes region.

On November 30, 2015, Environment Canada issued its winter outlook for December, January, and February, as part of their monthly climate outlooks. Above-average temperatures were favoured throughout most of Canada, with the exception of northern Quebec and the southern tip of Baffin Island; areas that were considered the most likely to see above normal temperatures included the Lower Mainland of British Columbia, the Maritime provinces, southern Newfoundland, central Quebec and Ontario, and northern Manitoba and Saskatchewan; in those areas, the probability of above-normal temperatures was over 80%. The areas where below-normal temperatures were favoured included extreme northern areas of Quebec and Labrador, along with southern parts of Baffin Island. Above average precipitation was favoured in the Lower Mainland of B.C., New Brunswick, northern Quebec, northern Newfoundland, the Northwest Territories, and western Nunavut. Below-average precipitation was favoured on the south-eastern tip of Baffin Island and a small area just north of Lake Superior.

Seasonal summary 

The winter of 2015–16 was quite unusual and historic in terms of winter weather. In December, two winter storms impacted the Great Lakes, with the latter one being a bit farther to the west, both brought roughly a foot of snow in some locations. Normally, in this area, this is not common, but the strong El Niño may have been a contributor to this. This was the warmest temperature in New York City in the second half of December on record. In fact, across the Lower 48, this was the warmest and wettest December on record at the time. Every single state in the Northeastern United States saw a record warm December. In 2021, an even warmer December was recorded across the Lower 48, with a mean temperature of  rather then . This meant Buffalo, New York until December 18, a record for latest first snow. A strong tornado outbreak also occurred from December 23–25, which a very similar event had occurred the year before, just weaker. After this system passed, a larger storm complex moved through the same areas impacted by the ice storm from Black Friday 2015. This storm brought blizzard conditions to parts of Texas and New Mexico, with areas reaching up to close to 2 feet of snow in parts of Texas, which is a rare event in that state. For comparison, the last time this has occurred (or near the same areas), was in 2011 during the Groundhog Day blizzard.

The month of January 2016 was variable in its weather patterns. Following the warm trend in December, an early cold snap brought close-to-average temperatures to the East Coast, at the same time a storm complex was moving through the Northeast, and due to the fresh batch of cold air, it was able to produce some snow on the back side of it. At the opposite end of the spectrum, the West Coast was receiving needed rainfall to help during its long-time drought. This brief period of relief soon ended. After that, around January 16–17, a potent storm system moved up the East Coast, bringing the first snowfall of the season to areas like Philadelphia and New York City. A few days later, an Alberta clipper moved through the central United States, producing a swath of snow from Illinois to North Carolina. This small system was then proceeded and eclipsed by a crippling and historic blizzard just days later on January 22–23.

In February, the historic weather events continued, as another snowstorm kicked off the month with a swath of snow from Colorado to Michigan. After the storm system passed, its cold front transformed into another potent snowstorm for the East Coast, with snowfall amounts up to 8 inches. From there, another winter storm occurred as a nor'easter, bringing more snow to New England on February 8. The cold lingered into Presidents Day as another winter storm began to take shape. This set the stage for more snow in the Northeast. What was interesting about the weather pattern for this system, was the 24-hour weather difference, for example, at 2:00pm EDT on February 15, New York City reported snow with temperatures in the 30s, and a day later, reported temperatures in the mid-50s and thunderstorms on February 16. The system departed by February 17. A week later around February 22–24, another winter storm formed and eventually produced the second-largest tornado outbreak ever recorded in February. The storm complex produced as much as 59 confirmed tornadoes, with 4 of them being rated an EF3, including areas which don't normally see tornadoes that strong. The massive system moved out of the United States by February 25.

March was quite extreme. Around March 10, an area of low pressure in the upper levels of the atmosphere dove into Mexico, where it stalled for a few days, and caused some extreme and record-breaking weather events from March 7–10. Parts of the South were inundated with days of heavy rain, with areas receiving more than 18 inches of rain, leading to historic flash flooding. At the same time, record-breaking temperatures pushed into the Northeast, with some areas reaching into the low 80s (which broke the record for earliest 80 degree day on record). The storm system also produced snow in Mexico, which rarely receives it at all. Around the spring equinox, winter was still not done. A weak nor'easter formed on March 20, and tracked up the East Coast later that day, producing a swath of snow up to 10 inches in some spots. The nor'easter was predicted to be stronger than what was actually observed, but due to computer models, direction of the low pressure, and amount of cold air present made it difficult to precisely time the storm out.

Even though winter was officially over, it felt like winter somewhat in the Northeast. An unusual cold blast occurred at the beginning of April, bringing temperatures 10-15°F (6-8°C) below average in the afflicted areas. It was cold enough for snow in parts of New England, and as a result, several Alberta clippers began to track their way to the East Coast. The first clipper brought mainly high winds and snow showers to much of the Northeast early on April 3, with mainly high wind warnings being issued. It then went to further deepen to a peak of  late on April 4. The next clipper system was weaker, but brought a swath of accumulating snow to the southeastern parts of New England. It later moved off late that night. A third clipper system began to edge its way into the Great Lakes on April 6, and brought the risk for wildfires as well. It moved into Canada while transitioning into a storm complex on April 7. A fourth system then moved across nearly the same areas from April 8–9, bringing even more spring snow to the Mid-Atlantic states. This system actually intensified into a small nor'easter on April 9, and brought  of wet snow from the Ohio Valley into the Northeast. It moved off later that night, but brought some more cold air with it. Finally, the cold air retreated out of the region by April 11–12, as warm air began to surge back in. The system moved slowly eastward, as a developing Omega Block pattern was expected to bring extreme relief to the cold stricken Midwest and East Coast.

Events

Late November ice storm 
Residents in the areas were without powers for days, if not weeks. Historic rainfall also fell too, breaking numerous records. 
At the same time, incoming moisture from weakening Hurricane Sandra in the East Pacific was starting to streak through Mexico into the southwestern United States. Interacting with the low pressure area, this combined to produce a plume of precipitation from ice to rain from southern Texas into Minnesota, due to high pressure situated off Maine keeping the Northeast dry for the holiday.

Some areas even broke their records for yearly rainfall totals from this system, due to the axis of moisture shooting into Canada. In total, 17 people died, including six in Kansas, three in Texas, three in Missouri and one in Utah, and over 110,000 left without power, especially around Oklahoma City.

Post-Christmas storm complex 

Two days after Christmas, a large storm complex with snow, severe weather and heavy rainfall impacted the Southern Plains and southern Rocky Mountains, including all or parts of the states of Colorado, New Mexico, Texas and Oklahoma. The system spawned tornadoes over central and eastern Texas and Oklahoma, while bringing blizzard conditions to the Texas and Oklahoma panhandles, most areas in New Mexico, and southern Colorado. The main area of low pressure moved northeast from the southern Plains to the eastern Great Lakes, while a secondary low pressure system formed east of the Delmarva Peninsula on December 29.  After impacting New Mexico and the Texas panhandle with record snowfall, the storm system left a swath of snow and ice accumulation from western Oklahoma to Michigan.  On December 29, the storm system brought a mix of snow, sleet and freezing rain to New York State and New England.

On December 26, 2015, it affected parts of the Texas Panhandle and resulted in the formation of tornadoes in the Dallas area, including an EF4 which struck the Garland area that evening.

Late January blizzard 

A crippling and historic blizzard occurred from January 22–23 in the Mid-Atlantic states. The storm was given various unofficial names, including Winter Storm Jonas, Blizzard of 2016, and Snowzilla among others. Locations in five states exceeded  of snow. The storm dropped  of snow in Washington, D.C., 22 inches in Philadelphia,  in Baltimore,  in New York City. States of emergency were declared in Maryland, North Carolina, Pennsylvania, Tennessee, West Virginia, Virginia, Delaware, New York, and Washington, D.C. The storm also caused coastal flooding in Delaware and New Jersey. High winds led to blizzard conditions in many areas.

Early February winter storm 

A trailing low pressure system to the previous weeks' blizzard had developed offshore California on January 29. The low and accompanying precipitation moved onshore the next day. At the time blizzard conditions were expected. The storm moved eastward into the Great Plains where tremendous snowfall occurred. On February 1, another area of low pressure led to severe weather across the Southeastern United States. Multiple tornadoes were reported in Alabama, Mississippi and Tennessee, including a large EF2 tornado. After the storm had passed, the cold front associated with it stalled over the East Coast late on February 4. A new low pressure developed off North Carolina that night and started to track up the coast. It impacted areas already hit hard by the previous blizzard about two weeks prior, and caused messy travel along Interstate 95 (Northeast).

February nor'easter 

On February 7, an elongated area of low pressure developed offshore to the west of Florida. While moving inland, it produced a decent dose of rainfall to the Sunshine State as it moved to the northeast. EST February 8. As it did so, it also began to transition into a nor'easter, as rainbands began to impact the eastern edges of North Carolina and South Carolina. There was some cold air aloft, allowing for a few areas of wet snow to develop further inland. As the cyclone continued to strengthen, it started to achieve the conditions of a bomb cyclone. Furthermore, the system started to form an eye compared to that of a typical Category 1 hurricane, however this was short-lived and dissolved a few hours later. Snowbands began to impact New England early in the morning of February 8, with some bands reaching up to snowfall rates of an inch per hour, especially near the coast. The outermost bands did not reach New Jersey and New York City, due to the nor'easter being far offshore. The system then continued to weaken as it moved northward, before finally merging with another low pressure system on February 10 to the south of it which had also exited from the East Coast.

Mid-February cold wave 

During mid-February, record-breaking cold temperatures swung across the Northeast United States and southeastern Canada. The recorded temperatures were the coldest recorded since a very similar cold wave impacted the region exactly a year prior. In New York City, the temperature in Central Park gets below  for the first time since January 19th, 1994, and the windchill at JFK Airport on February 14 at 6:30am hit . The low of  set a record for the coldest Valentines Day on record. Meanwhile, Binghamton hit .

In spite of  temperatures in New York on February 14, by February 16, the temperature reached .

Late February tornado outbreak 

On February 23, a low-pressure area developed near the east end of Texas and began to track northeastwards into the Mid-Atlantic States in the early hours of February 24. At the same time, ahead of the cold front, severe thunderstorms developed ahead of it, which would eventually lead to the second largest tornado outbreak of the month of February.

March extreme weather events 

On March 7, an area of low pressure system from the Pineapple Express moved ashore in California as part of the pattern change that allowed the Golden State to receive much-needed rain. Late that evening, it dove into Mexico where it became detached from the main jet stream. It then stalled for a few days and caused some extreme weather events, such as record-breaking heat in the Northeast, with areas achieving their earliest 80 °F day on record, which was the result of high pressure off the coast of Florida. It also caused historic floods in the South as well. The highest rainfall report was  near Monroe in Louisiana. The historic events also caused rare snow in Mexico, which rarely receives snow at all.

Late March blizzard 

On March 21, an area of low pressure moved ashore on the West Coast, with a limited amount of moisture available. Because of this precipitation was originally isolated. As it moved eastward on March 22 it started to intensify and as such snowfall began to become widespread. The storm also began to transition into an extratropical cyclone, achieving a peak of  two times on March 23. Blizzard warnings were issued for areas around Denver due to the strong winds accompanying the system along with snowfall. Parts of Interstate 80 were shut down due to the extreme winter weather conditions. Ahead of its cold front, thunderstorms began to fire up, prompting the National Weather Service to issue a tornado watch. A squall line later developed out of this as more storms began to fire up and move eastwards, with the severe weather threat shifting more to the east towards the East Coast. It then rapidly weakened and moved offshore late on March 25, dissipating the next day.

Early April clippers and cold wave 
In the beginning of April, an unusual blast of cold air rushed into the Northeast, bringing temperatures 10–30 °F (6-17°C) below average for most of the area. Some areas even broke records for lowest April low temperatures. This was paired with a series of Alberta clippers moving through the Great Lakes through the weekend of April 2–3. The first clipper brought mainly high winds with it, knocking out power to a few thousand.

The next clipper system was weaker than the previous one, alias only reaching a peak of  early on April 3, however, gained enough characteristics to become a full-fledged winter storm. Moving fairly quickly, this snowmaker began to drop snow near the Great Lakes at its peak intensity, and as it neared the Northeast, snow began to spread eastward. Early on April 4, light to moderate snow had reached Boston, with locally heavier snowfall rates at times, which made visibility low. By mid-day, rainfall began to fire up along the clipper's cold front, spreading into New York City and New Jersey. This forced the New York Yankees to postpone their home openers against the Houston Astros. It began to accelerate at the same time, moving off the coast late the same day. Several cities in northern Maine also broke monthly record lows. A third system began plowing into the same areas on April 5–6, bringing more snow to the Great Lakes, and also the risk of wildfires in the Southwest. This clipper transitioned into a storm complex early on April 7, and brought heavy rain to parts of the New York metropolitan area. It lingered into early April 8 before finally retreating into Canada. The fourth clipper postponed a Baltimore Orioles game. As it approached the coastline, it began to transition into a small nor'easter. The system moved offshore late by April 9, but brought some more cold temperatures behind it, setting more record lows. Due to the cold brought by the system, wind chills at Nationals Park hovered in the upper 20s and lower 30s. This forced a game between the Miami Marlins and Washington Nationals to postpone.

The cold wave finally lifted out of the Northeastern United States by April 12, due to an imminent pattern change that would allow warm air to surge back into the region.

Mid-April storm complex 

On April 13, an area of disturbed weather associated with the jet stream moved ashore on the West Coast. Moving slowly it dived into the High Plains and Rocky Mountains during the course of the day on April 14. Multiple rescue efforts had to be made in southeastern Texas early on April 18, due to the extremely heavy rainfall and flooding. The upper low gradually moved out of the region by April 19, alas at a very slow rate.

Records 
This is a list of records broken in North America during the 2015–16 winter.

United States 
 2nd warmest winter in Boston, Massachusetts, and New York City (behind 2001–02)
 Wettest December ever recorded (Lower 48 states)
 Highest snowfall from a single snowstorm in Allentown, Pennsylvania, Philadelphia, Pennsylvania, Newark, New Jersey, New York City and Harrisburg, Pennsylvania
 Snowiest January on record at John F. Kennedy International Airport
 Second wettest winter on record in Atlanta, and La Crosse, Wisconsin.
 Wettest winter on record in Waterloo, Iowa, and Lincoln, Nebraska
 Warmest winter on record (Lower 48 states)

Season effects
This is a table of all of the events that have occurred in the 2015–16 North American winter. It includes their duration, damage, impacted locations, and death totals. Deaths in parentheses are additional and indirect (an example of an indirect death would be a traffic accident), but were still related to that storm. All of the damage figures are in 2016 USD.

See also 
 2015–16 UK and Ireland windstorm season

References

External links 
 2015 Storm Summaries from the Weather Prediction Center
 2016 Storm Summaries from the Weather Prediction Center
 Climate Prediction Center: What to expect this winter: NOAA's outlook reveals what conditions are favored across the US

 
2015-12
North American winters
2015 meteorology
2016 meteorology
Winter
Winter